Angelbrook is a Canadian community in the province of Newfoundland and Labrador.

It is located in the Number 7 Census Division and became part of Glovertown in 1987.  It is more properly known as Angle Brook.

See also
List of communities in Newfoundland and Labrador

Populated coastal places in Canada
Populated places in Newfoundland and Labrador